Minuscule 459 (in the Gregory-Aland numbering), α 104 (in the Soden numbering), is a Greek minuscule manuscript of the New Testament, on parchment. It is dated by a colophon to the year 1092. 
Formerly it was labeled by 89a and 99p.

Description 

The codex contains the text of the Acts of the Apostles, Catholic epistles, Pauline epistles, and Book of Revelation on 276 parchment leaves. The text is written in one column per page, in 27 lines per page.

The order of books: Acts, Catholic epistles, and Pauline epistles. The ending of the Epistle to the Romans has the order of verses: 16:23; 16:25-27; 16:24 (as in codices 025 33 104 256 263 365 436 1319 1573 1852 Peshitta arm).

Text 

The Greek text of the codex is a mixed in the Pauline epistles and the Byzantine text-type elsewhere. Aland placed it in Category III in the Pauline epistles and in Category V elsewhere.

History 

The manuscript was examined and slightly collated by Birch and Scholz. Antonio Maria Biscioni published its facsimile in 1752. C. R. Gregory saw it in 1886.

Formerly it was labeled by 89a and 99p. In 1908 Gregory gave the number 459 to it.

It is currently housed at the Laurentian Library (Plutei IV. 32) in Florence.

See also 

 List of New Testament minuscules
 Biblical manuscript
 Textual criticism

References

Further reading 

 Antonio Maria Biscioni, Bibliothecae Mediceo-Laurentianae catalogus, Florence 1752, vol. 2, p. 73-76.

External links 
 

Greek New Testament minuscules
11th-century biblical manuscripts